The Japanese National Proportional Representation Block, known in Japan as the  is an electoral district for the House of Councillors, the upper house of the National Diet of Japan. It consists of the whole nation and elects 50 members per election, 100 in total (fully effective after the 2022 regular election), by D'Hondt method proportional representation (PR).

History
Proportional voting was introduced to Japan in the 1983 House of Councillors election. The proportional district replaced the previous  which elected 100 members of the House of Councillors (50 per election) by single non-transferable vote, i.e. votes were for individuals not parties as in the prefectural districts. Initially, the proportional representation block also elected 50 members, but was reduced to 48 members in the 2001 election, bringing the total of proportional members down to 96 in 2004.

From 1983 to 1998, the vote in the proportional district of the House of Councillors had to be for a party, lists were closed. Since the 2001 election there is the option to cast a preference vote for a single candidate instead, the vote then counts for both the party in the allocation of proportional seats to party lists, as well as the candidate in the ordering of party lists. From 2001 to 2016, the system was a most open list system: The ranking of candidates on a party list strictly followed the number of preference votes. This ranking also applies to the runner-up replacements in case of vacancies.

In the 2019 election, the proportional district is enlarged to 50 members; and the proportional election system is modified to no longer be fully open: In a so-called tokutei-waku (特定枠, literally "special frame") parties may now choose to prioritize certain proportional candidates, such protected candidates can no longer be elected personally, but always come first in the allocation of proportional seats.

Unlike elections to the House of Representatives, where a proportional segment was introduced in 1996, a simultaneous dual candidacy in both the majoritarian and the proportional election is not allowed in the House of Councillors.

Summary of results for major parties 
Ruling parties at the time of the election are bolded.

Recent results 

<div class="noprint">
The total (party+preference) proportional votes, vote shares and allocated seats for each party are in the top row. Below are all elected candidates with number of preference votes in bold, and runner-up plus losing incumbents if any. "..." indicates higher-ranking losing non-incumbents. For parties without any seat, the top two candidates are listed with their personal votes.

2019

2016

2013

Notes

References

Districts of the House of Councillors (Japan)
Japanese National Proportional Representation Block